Iraklis Neos Zygos Football Club is a Greek football club based in Neos Zygos, Xanthi, Greece.

Honours

Domestic

 Xanthi FCA Champions: 2
 2010–11, 2018–19
 Xanthi FCA Cup Winners: 1
 2014–15

References

External links

Football clubs in Eastern Macedonia and Thrace
Xanthi
Association football clubs established in 1952
1952 establishments in Greece
Gamma Ethniki clubs